Crocigrapha is a genus of moths of the family Noctuidae. It contains one species, Crocigrapha normani, commonly called Norman's quaker. It is found primarily in eastern North America, although it has been reported as far west as Alberta and Colorado.

References

External links
Natural History Museum Lepidoptera genus database
Crocigrapha at funet

Hadeninae